The cornett, cornetto, or zink is an early wind instrument that dates from the Medieval, Renaissance and Baroque periods, popular from 1500 to 1650.

It was used in a variety of musical forms, including performances by professional musicians, state music and liturgical music. It accompanied choral music. It also featured in popular music in what are now called alta capellas or loud wind ensembles. The cornett was characterized as "loud as a trumpet and soft as a recorder." It was popular in Germany, where guild laws made it illegal for residents to play trumpets. As well, the mute cornett variant was a quiet instrument, playing "gentle, soft and sweet."

The instrument has features of both the trumpet and the flute. Like the trumpet, the cornett has a mouthpiece or cup, where the instrument is sounded with the player's lips. Like the flute, it has fingerholes and sometimes keys to determine pitch; pitch can also be changed on low notes by the tension of the player's lips. The cornett was built in two styles, straight and curved. It was also built in a variety of sizes from highest cornettino downward through alto cornett, cornone tenor cornett, and bass cornett.
It is not to be confused with the modern cornet. The spelling cornet which had applied to the instrument in this article since about 1400 A.D. was transferred to a brass-tubed trumpet in the early 20th century, and cornett became the modern spelling of this instrument. The most common is the curved cornett, also called treble cornett or alto cornett.

Construction

Pipes as short as the cornett are only able to play two or three notes, if the only tool is the wind going through the tube. The cornett then, can play A and the next octave A. Beyond the upper A, a trumpeter might be able to reach the 12th note E. Other short trumpets had this issue, including King Tut's Trumpet, capable of only playing 2 notes without a modern mouthpiece.

The cornett is not limited to trumpet notes; it also draws on fingerholes to achieve the notes between the natural upper and lower limits. The cornett has six fingerholes in the front and one thumbhole in the back. The holes allow the instrument to play a diatonic scale. Additionally, using "cross fingering" and different tension in the lips, the instrument can play the chromatic scale. A player in 1738 who mastered the cross-fingering and lip tension was documented to have reached 27 notes and half notes. In comparison, Praetorius gave cornetts credit for achieving 15 notes, before players used techniques to expand the range.

The bore of the instrument is conical, narrow at the tip and wide at the bottom. The ordinary curved treble cornett is made by splitting a length of wood ("plum, cherry or pear") and carving out the two halves to make the gently conical, curved bore. The halves are then glued together, and the outside planed to an octagonal cross section, the whole being bound in thin black leather.

Six front finger holes and a thumb hole on the back (like on the recorder) are bored in the instrument, and are slightly undercut. The socket for the mouthpiece at the narrow end is reinforced with a brass collar, concealed by an ornamental silver or brass mount. The separate cup mouthpiece is usually made of horn, ivory, or bone, with a thin rim and thread-wrapped shank, which is used to tune the instrument. Because it lacks a little-finger hole at the bottom, its lowest note is the A below middle C, though another tone lower G could be produced by slackening the lips to flatten the note.

The instruments were made with a very small mouthpiece described as "sharp", and as a result, images don't always show players blowing like a trumpet. 

Mute cornetts were made of boxwood. The top of the instrument is narrow; the bore is about 4 mm wide at the top of the instrument, with a mouthpiece carved into the top 13 mm across and 9 mm deep. The mouthpiece is cone-shaped.

Cornett family
Cornetts were built in two styles, curved and straight.

The cornett was, like almost all Renaissance and Baroque instruments, made in a complete family; the different sizes being the high cornettino, the cornett (or curved cornett), the tenor cornett (or lizard) and the rare bass cornett. The serpent largely supplanted the bass cornett in the 17th century. Other versions include the mute cornett, which is a straight narrow-bore instrument with integrated mouthpiece, quiet enough to be used in a consort of viols or even recorders.

Curved cornetts
Cornetts shaped with gradual curve, greater than 90°, a single curve like a comma, or an S-curve. The instrument had a conical bore, and the outside was octagonal.

Curved cornets were traditionally black, the wood covered in black leather.

Soprano

The cornettino is the soprano member of the cornett family. In Syntagma Musicum, it was presented as being about 1.5 feet long. It had a range from E4-E6 in the 16th and 17th centuries. In the 18th century that changed to D4 to D6.

Treble

The 1911 Encyclopedia Britannica defined this instrument using French name, It called the treble cornett, dessus and gave its lowest fingered note as A.

It's fingered range was A3 to A5, the lowest being one note higher than on the alto. To get below A3, players had to slacken their lips.

Sibyl Marcuse did not name the normal cornett, but gave its range, which is that of the treble. David Jarratt-Knock counted surviving instruments in museums to arrive at the treble cornett being the standard or most commonly found cornett.

Alto

The instrument was about 2 feet long in 1619 A.D., according to the scaled drawing in Syntagma Musicum.

It was built to start playing a tone lower than the treble and has a fingered range from G3-G5. Proper technique would start the lowest note at F.

The 1911 Encyclopedia Britannica called this the haute-contre or alto cornet. Baines said that the use of this variant for an alto part was "widely speculated."

Tenor

The tenor cornet (or Italian cornone, French basse de cornetà bouquin, German Basszink) was the tenor instrument in the cornett family, and was about 3.5 feet long in the 1619 drawing in Syntagma Musicum. It was "proportionally wider" (bottom compared to top) than the treble and alto were, and that changed the tenor's sound quality to be more bugle-like.

Although the French and German names implies it was bass instrument, it is placed as a tenor instrument by musical-instrument historians Sibyl Marcuse and Anthony C. Baines, who separately point out that two examples of a "real bass" instrument exist. Both said that the bass instrument should be called contrebass de cornet à bouquin.

The cornone was pitched about a fifth below the alto cornett, from C3 to D5.

Even though tenor and bass instruments were created for the family, these came later in the instrument's development, perhaps as long as 50 years after the instrument became mainstream. The instrument was paired with other instruments to play the lower ranges, especially trombones.

Bass

There are limited examples of instruments that are tuned below the tenor cornett. One is called hautecontre de cornet à bouquin.

The other should be called contrebass de cornet à bouquin, and there are only two examples of it, one in the Paris Conservatoire museum and the other in Hamburg.

These were tuned "a pitch or so below the type instrument." This was put differently elsewhere as an octave below the cornettino. The instrument in Paris, a contrebass de cornet à bouquin, is described as having "an octagonal exterior and 4 extension keys." The Hamburg example has 2 extension keys.

Straight cornetts
Two kinds of cornets with a straight conical body with conical bore. These were light-colored, as the yellow boxwood was not covered in leather.

Straight cornett

The straight cornett has a straight, conical body. The specific instrument differs from the mute cornett by having a removeable mouthpiece.

Surviving instruments in museums are mainly treble with a range of A3 to A5. A few survive as tenor instruments, range C3 to D5.

In other languages, this is called gerader Zink and gelber Zink in German, and cornetto diritto or cornetto bianco in Italian.

Mute cornett
Straight cornett with the mouthpiece carved into the end of the instrument's body. The instrument tapers in thickness, until at the top it is about 1.3 cm wide. The instruments were mainly treble cornetts, tuned to the same range as the curved treble cornetts, G3-A5. The others found in museums are soprano cornetts, also tuned like curved instruments to E4-E6.

Praetorius drew a tenor mute cornett, with a seventh hole covered and labeled that a lower note could be reached by covering the base. In that range, the six holes with thumb hole could have delivered A3 to F5. The extra plate would make it G3 to F5, with the base covered F3 to F5.

This instrument's name tells something of its tonal nature. Its "gentle, soft and sweet" sound is different than the other cornetts because of its mouthpiece.

The mouthpiece is similar to that in a French horn; instead of being a cup like the other cornetts, it is a cone, about 9 millimeters deep. Inside it transitions from cone to instrumental bore smoothly, without "sharpness."

On the outside, there isn't an obvious lip carved.

In other languages, this is called cornet muet in French, stiller Zink in German, cornetto muto in Italian and cornetts muta in Spanish.

Music for the cornett

Viruoso performance
The cornett, among other aerophones, were commonly used for virtuosic musical performances, equivalent to performances by a lead singer or violinist. A relatively large amount of solo music for the cornett (and/or violin) survives.

Giovanni Bassano was a virtuoso early player of the cornett, and Giovanni Gabrieli wrote much of his polychoral, with Bassano playing it. Heinrich Schütz also used the instrument extensively, especially in his earlier work; he had studied in Venice with Gabrieli and was likely acquainted with Bassano's playing.

The use of the instrument had declined by 1700, although the instrument was still common in Europe until the late 18th century. Johann Sebastian Bach, Georg Philipp Telemann and their German contemporaries used both the cornett and cornettino in cantatas to play in unison with the soprano voices of the choir. Occasionally, these composers allocated a solo part to the cornetto (see Bach's cantata O Jesu Christ, meins Lebens Licht, BWV 118). Alessandro Scarlatti used the cornetto or pairs of cornetts in a number of his operas. Johann Joseph Fux used a pair of mute cornetts in a Requiem.

It was scored for by Gluck, in his opera Orfeo ed Euridice (he suggested the soprano trombone as an alternative) and features in the TV theme music Testament by Nigel Hess, released in 1983.

The cornett was chosen to play colla parte  (in which instrumentalists play the same notes as the vocal part) in works by Bach. These include Christ lag in Todes Banden, BWV 4 (paired with trombones) and Gottlob! nun geht das Jahr zu Ende, BWV 28 (paired with trombones).

Popular performance
Music books allowed non-professional musicians to learn instruments and play together. Such books included music theory, how to read sheet music, and instructions for how to reach notes on instruments. Professional musicians performed in public spaces and as part of official pomp before the country's residents. Images of heaven reflected a musicality that showed heavenly orchestras performing before God, and instruments were brought into churches.

Public performances where the cornett might be played included the alta capella and the Collegium Musicum.

Liturgical performance

Like the serpent, another fingerhole horn that was paired with it, the cornett was used to reinforce the human voice, accompanying choral music. The cornett was deemed to be similar to the voice of a boy soprano, a part found in English liturgical music which the cornett accompanied. Not only English, for Mersenne speaks of the cornett being "heard with the choir voices in the cathedrals or chapels."

Historically, two cornetts were frequently used in consort with three sackbuts, often to double a church choir, into the 18th century. This was particularly popular in Venetian churches such as the Basilica San Marco, where extensive instrumental accompaniment was encouraged, particularly in use with antiphonal choirs.

History

Origins

The cornett has been considered by musical historians to be a development of the medieval horn, such as a cow's horn. Francis Galpin believed the horns preceding the cornett to be goat horns.

Plain horns in the shape of animal horns have been found in medieval European art as far back as the Utrecht Psalter in the 9th century A.D. However, horns with fingerholes also began appearing in manuscript miniatures in the 10th century A.D. By the 12th century, these were being carved with a six sided or 8 sided exterior. In the 11th century, some of the fingerhole horns began to be made longer and thinner, beginning to take on the appearance of the cornett.

The French coradoiz, rendered now as cor à doigts, meant "fingerhole horn", was seen in the 13th to 15th centuries A.D.

The earliest cowhorn instruments were played with one hand covering four or fewer fingerholes and the other stopping the bell to create additional tones, much like on a French horn. In Northern Europe, these horns, referred to in Scandinavian languages as bukkehorns, were made from natural animal horns.

The name cornet was printed in English in the Morte d'Arthure, completed by Sir Thomas Mallory about 1470.

The cornett in its current form was developed by about 1500, as an improvement over earlier designs of fingerhole horns.

That was the path that led to the curved cornetts; another way led to the straight cornetts. In central Europe, cornetts were made from wood turned on a lathe; the fusion of these two instrument-building traditions as the cornett advanced in melodic capability explains the coexistence of the straight and curved cornetts, with the form of the latter most likely being a skeuomorphic trait derived from animal horns.

Ends and beginnings

The cornett was at the height of its popularity between 1550 and 1650. The instrument had declined by the 18th century. When the instrument was needed in the 19th century, it had gone extinct. Efforts to re-create it were not immediately successful and other instruments have been used in an attempt to replace it in classical music. These include the soprano saxophone, trumpet and oboe. Since the 19th century, the instrument is being made again and materials used for the body have widened to include resins. Recorded music of the instrument can be found.

Prominent cornettists today include Roland Wilson (ensemble Musica Fiata), Jean Tubéry (La Fenice), Arno Paduch (Johann Rosenmüller Ensemble), and Bruce Dickey (Concerto Palatino).

Playing the cornett

The cornett's pitches are controlled using a combination of the player's lips and fingerholes. The lips change pitch through different tensions. The fingerholes alter the length of the sound column.

Cornetts are made with a mouthpiece, similar to that on brass instruments, but very small. Unlike the brass mouthpieces, players don't press the instrument to the center of their mouths, as on a trumpet. Rather the technique to produce sound is to hold the instrument to the side of the mouth, where the player's lips are thinner. Players stretch their lips to tighten them, with help from cheek muscles.

The technique is not unique to cornets, but has also been used for the traditional animal-horn horns, such as the shofur and Slovak shepherd's horn, as well as for folk horns such as the Russian rozhok.

Girolamo dalla Casa wrote about how the coronet should sound when played, and in doing so revealed other ways it could sound as well. He felt that the instrument was meant to imitate the human voice, saying,  "The cornetto is the most excellent of the wind instruments since it imitates the human voice better than the other instruments." He warned that improperly played,  it would sound "horn-like or muted."

To play it properly, he said that player's must focus on the tone (with lips not spread apart and loose, or too tight and shrill). He felt tonguing was important to the sound, with energy but not too aggressive. Finally he felt that divisions or dimmunations should be used,  but sparingly and well. He said that cornettists should focus on making their playing sound like the human voice.

Learning to play
Books with cornett instruction included Grund-richtiger Unterricht der Musicalischen Kunst (Fundamentally correct instruction in the musical arts) by Daniel Speer, 1697 A.D. and Museum Musicum Theoretico-Practicum (Museum of theoretical-practical music) by Joseph Friedrich Bernhard Caspar Majer, 1732. Books written for other instruments were also applicable to the cornett. Among these were Ganassi 
dal Fontego (Opera intitulata Fontegara, 1535) and Bismantova (Compendio musicale, 1677). These books covered the recorder, but the instructions on "tonguing" with "force and speed" has application to the cornett, which was pictured on the Fontegara title page illustration.

Besides tonguing, books taught students to improvise. Students learning cornet music were encouraged to play in the "diminuative", looking at sheet music and adapting it by creating runs of fast notes to replace long slow notes in written works.

The book (Il Vero Modo Di Diminuir, 1584) by cornett virtoso Girolamo Dalla Casa  focused on tone, tonguing and divisions to make the cornett sound like the human voice.

The cornett and authentic performance
As a result of the recent historically informed performance movement the cornett has been rediscovered, and modern works for the instrument have been written.

See also
Cornettino,
Tenor cornett,
Mute Cornett,
Alto Cornett,
Serpent,
Sackbut.

References

External links

 The French Wikipedia cornett page shows photos of two existing specimens of the bass cornett
 A third bass cornett in the collection of the Musée de la Musique, Paris
 A page about the cornett
 Christopher Monk Instruments , one of the more well-known modern makers of cornetts

Extant cornetts at The Metropolitan Museum of Art
 Ivory Cornetto, 1570–80, Germany
 Tenor Cornetto, 17th century, France

Modern performance
Online sound recordings of modern performance, by Antiqua
L'Arpeggiata with Christina Pluhar as conductor, (winner of the 2010 Dutch Edison) makes use of one or two cornetts
City of Lincoln Waites (The Mayor of Lincoln's own Band of Musick)
Concerto Palatino, a leading ensemble centered on the cornetto and trombone and directed by Bruce Dickey and Charles Toet.
 The English Cornett and Sackbut Ensemble, a performance group that makes use of the cornett
Ensemble La Fenice, A French period performance group directed by cornettist Jean Tubery.
His Majestys Sagbutts & Cornetts (est. 1982), the pre-eminent, internationally renowned British cornett and sackbut ensemble.
Johann Rosenmüller Ensemble, a performance group directed by the German cornetto player Arno Paduch
QuintEssential – Sackbut and Cornett ensemble

Baroque instruments
Early musical instruments
Horns
Renaissance instruments